Osowo Małe  is a settlement in the administrative district of Gmina Studzienice, within Bytów County, Pomeranian Voivodeship, in northern Poland.

The settlement has a population of 9.

See also

History of Pomerania

References

Osowo Male